Wang Tao (Simplified Chinese: 王涛; 22 April 1970 – 3 November 2022) was a Chinese professional footballer who played as a striker. He made two appearances for the China national team. After his retirement he helped establish the newly formed Beijing Baxy football team and would become their chairman until he left in 2011.

Biography
Wang Tao was a highly prolific striker who rose to prominence with Dalian Wanda FC during the period when the Chinese league moved towards full professionalism. Benefiting from the professional league system Wang Tao became a highly prolific striker and aided the team to win the 1994 league title, while personally coming second in the top goal scorers chart. This led to several further titles and Dalian becoming the dominant team within the league, however, while he saw his teammates quickly establish themselves within the national team Wang Tao would have to wait until a friendly against USA on 29 January 1997 in a 2-1 victory before he was given his chance to make an impact at the international stage. Wang Tao would, however, only make one further international appearance despite his consistent goalscoring form until the 2000 league season saw his teammate Wang Peng take over from him at Dalian and Chinese football teams. Wang Tao would then join Beijing Guoan where he ended his football career.

Wang died on 3 November 2022, at the age of 52.

Honours
Dalian Wanda FC
Chinese Jia-A League: 1994, 1996, 1997, 1998
Chinese Super Cup: 1997

References

External links
Player profile at sodasoccer.com

1970 births
2022 deaths
Chinese footballers
Footballers from Dalian
China international footballers
Dalian Shide F.C. players
Beijing Guoan F.C. players
Asian Games silver medalists for China
Asian Games medalists in football
Association football forwards
Footballers at the 1994 Asian Games
Medalists at the 1994 Asian Games